A Lady in Her Bath is an oil on wood painting by French artist François Clouet, created in 1571.

Description
It measures 92.3 x 81.2 cm (36 5/16 x 31 15/16 in.). The picture is in the National Gallery of Art, Washington DC, and is one of only three paintings signed by Clouet.

Analysis
The teenaged female bather is unknown. It is possible that she is Diane de Poitiers, mistress of King Henry II of France when she was a teenager. Scholar Roger Trinquet suggested in 1966 that the teenaged lady is Mary Queen of Scots. The lady's face resembles other portraits of Mary, especially a drawing by Clouet depicting Mary in mourning. Trinquet believes the painting was intended as a satire for a Huguenot patron. The painting set a fashion for portraits of bathers. According to scholars, the bather had given birth.

The National Gallery writes:

References

1571 paintings
Paintings by François Clouet
Collections of the National Gallery of Art
Works about adolescence
Nude art